Stapylton is a mixed-use locality in the City of Gold Coast, Queensland, Australia.

Geography

Stapylton is bounded to the west by the Albert River and the Pacific Motorway.

Stapylton has the following mountains in the north of the locality:

History
The area was named after surveyor Granville William Chetwynd Stapylton (1800–1840), who was killed by Aborigines on 31 May 1840, near Mount Lindesay.

Stapylton State School opened on 18 May 1920. It closed in 1961. The school was located on the south-eastern corner of Hester Drive and Stapylton Jacobs Well Road (approx ).

The Yatala drive-in theatre was opened on 27 October 1974.

Stapylton was once part of the Shire of Albert until its amalgamation in 1995.

Economy 
Australia's first green waste to energy power plant was built at Stapylton.

The suburb contains the Mount Stapylton Weather station, several quarries and the Stapylton Landfill and Recycling Centre.  The radar tower is 30 m tall and was completed in 2006.

Education
There are no schools in Staplyton. The nearest government primary school is Mount Warren Park State School in Mount Warren Park to the west. The nearest government secondary school  is Beenleigh State High School in Beenleigh to the west and Ormeau Woods State High School in Ormeau to the south.

Amenities

The Yatala drive-in theatre is at 100 Stapylton Jacobs Well Road.

Attractions
Supercars team Dick Johnson Racing is based in Stapylton.

References

External links

 

Suburbs of the Gold Coast, Queensland
Localities in Queensland